Mill Meadow is a football stadium in Castledawson, County Londonderry, Northern Ireland. It is the home stadium of local football team Moyola Park F.C. It hosted its first competitive match on 16 January 2010, when Moyola Park hosted Lurgan Celtic in an IFA Championship 2 fixture. Moyola Park had previously played at the eponymous Moyola Park.

The new ground includes a "3G" artificial pitch and was financed in part by a grant of £1.55m from Sport Northern Ireland, with other funding provided by Magherafelt District Council, the Trustees of the Chichester Club, the Moyola Park club itself and several individuals. The total cost was almost £2m.

Mill Meadow is also used by Wakehurst F.C.

Mill Meadow was also used to host the 2011–12 and 2012–13 Irish Intermediate Cup and Irish Junior Cup finals. In September 2012 the ground hosted 2 fixtures in a UEFA Under 17 Ladies' Mini Tournament – England v Israel and N.Ireland v Italy.

References

Association football venues in Northern Ireland
Sports venues in County Londonderry
Sports venues completed in 2010
21st-century architecture in Northern Ireland